The 1979 British Grand Prix (formally the XXXII Marlboro British Grand Prix) was a Formula One motor race held at Silverstone on 14 July 1979. It was the ninth race of the 1979 World Championship of F1 Drivers and the 1979 International Cup for F1 Constructors.

The 68-lap race was won by Clay Regazzoni, driving a Williams-Ford. It was the first Formula One victory for the Williams team and Regazzoni's final victory in Formula One. René Arnoux finished second in a Renault, with Jean-Pierre Jarier third in a Tyrrell-Ford.

Qualifying

Qualifying report 
Qualifying saw Alan Jones take his and the Williams team's first pole position by 0.6 seconds from Jean-Pierre Jabouille in the Renault; the Williams FW07 had been modified by engineers Patrick Head and Frank Dernie to correct some aerodynamic problems on the car. Nelson Piquet took third in the Brabham with the second Williams of Clay Regazzoni alongside him on the second row, while René Arnoux in the second Renault and Niki Lauda in the second Brabham made up the third row. Completing the top ten were John Watson in the McLaren, the Lotuses of Carlos Reutemann and Mario Andretti, and Jacques Laffite in the Ligier. The Ferraris disappointed, with championship leader Jody Scheckter only managing 11th and Gilles Villeneuve 13th.

Qualifying classification

Race

Race report 
At the start of the race, Regazzoni charged into the lead, but was repassed by team-mate Jones and Jabouille before the end of the first lap. Andretti and the Ferraris also made fast starts, running close to Piquet, Lauda and Arnoux. At the end of lap 2, Piquet made a mistake at Woodcote and spun off, before Andretti dropped out with a broken wheel bearing on lap 4. Then Lauda encountered brake problems which eventually led to his retirement on lap 13, leaving Arnoux fourth with Scheckter fifth and Villeneuve dutifully following the South African.

Up at the front, Jones established a commanding lead over Jabouille, who was struggling on Michelin tyres that were wearing quickly. On lap 17, the Frenchman pitted for new tyres, promoting Regazzoni to second. However, disaster struck for Jabouille when, after a long stop, part of his front wing got caught in an air hose that had not been removed from under the car and was broken off as he accelerated. He was forced to return to the pits for repairs, during which his turbo overheated.

At half-distance, Jones still led comfortably, with Regazzoni still second and well clear of Arnoux, and Laffite moving ahead of the Ferraris into fourth. Then, approaching Woodcote at the end of lap 39, Jones's engine failed, a water pump problem causing it to overheat. Six laps later, Laffite also retired with engine trouble. This left only four drivers on the lead lap - Regazzoni, Arnoux, Scheckter and Villeneuve - with Jean-Pierre Jarier up to fifth in his Tyrrell and Watson sixth.

The Ferraris were also struggling on Michelins, and Villeneuve pitted for new tyres on lap 50, before stopping with fuel vaporization problems five laps from the end. Scheckter, meanwhile, was lapped by Regazzoni on lap 56, before Jarier and Watson passed him in the closing laps.

Regazzoni eventually took the chequered flag 24 seconds ahead of Arnoux, giving Williams their first Formula One victory. It was also Regazzoni's fifth and final win and, to date, the last win in F1 for a Swiss driver. After Jarier, Watson and Scheckter came Jacky Ickx, taking the final point in the second Ligier.

This was the first Grand Prix on which James Hunt, who had retired from racing the previous month, commentated alongside Murray Walker for the BBC's Grand Prix programme.

Classification 

Notes
  – Elio de Angelis finished 11th, but received a one-minute time penalty for a jump start.

Championship standings after the race 

Drivers' Championship standings

Constructors' Championship standings

References 

British Grand Prix
British Grand Prix
Grand Prix
British Grand Prix